The Steiner conic or more precisely Steiner's generation of a conic, named after the Swiss mathematician Jakob Steiner, is an alternative method to define a non-degenerate projective conic section in a projective plane over a field.

The usual definition of a conic uses a quadratic form (see Quadric (projective geometry)). Another alternative definition of a conic uses a hyperbolic polarity. It is due to K. G. C. von Staudt and sometimes called a von Staudt conic. The disadvantage of von Staudt's definition is that it only works when the underlying field has odd characteristic (i.e.).

Definition of a Steiner conic 
Given two pencils  of lines at two points  (all lines containing  and   resp.) and a projective but not perspective mapping  of  onto . Then the intersection points of corresponding lines form a non-degenerate projective conic section (figure 1)

A perspective mapping  of a pencil  onto a pencil  is a bijection (1-1 correspondence) such that corresponding lines intersect on a fixed line , which is called the axis of the perspectivity  (figure 2).

A projective mapping is a finite product of perspective mappings.

From the inscribed angle theorem one gets: The intersection points of corresponding lines form a circle.

Examples of commonly used fields are the real numbers , the rational numbers  or the complex numbers . The construction also works over finite fields, providing examples in finite projective planes.

Remark:
The fundamental theorem for projective planes states, that a projective mapping in a projective plane over a field (pappian plane) is uniquely determined by prescribing the images of three lines. That means that, for the Steiner generation of a conic section, besides two points  only the images of 3 lines have to be given. These 5 items (2 points, 3 lines) uniquely determine the conic section.

Remark:
The notation "perspective" is due to the dual statement: The projection of the points on a line  from a center  onto a line  is called a perspectivity (see below).

Example 
For the following example the images of the lines  (see picture) are given: . The projective mapping  is the product of the following perspective mappings : 1)  is the perspective mapping of the pencil at point  onto the pencil at point  with axis . 2)  is the perspective mapping of the pencil at point  onto the pencil at point  with axis .
First one should check that  has the properties: . Hence for any line  the image  can be constructed and therefore the images of an arbitrary set of points. The lines  and  contain only the conic points  and  resp..

A proof that this method generates a conic section follows from switching to the affine restriction with line  as the line at infinity, point  as the origin of a coordinate system with points  as points at infinity of the x- and y-axis resp. and point . The affine part of the generated curve appears to be the hyperbola .

Remark:
The Steiner generation of a conic section provides simple methods for the construction of ellipses, parabolas and hyperbolas which are commonly called the parallelogram methods.
The figure that appears while constructing a point (figure 3) is the 4-point-degeneration of Pascal's theorem.

Steiner generation of a dual conic

Definitions and the dual generation 
Dualizing (see duality (projective geometry)) a projective plane means exchanging the points with the lines and the operations intersection and connecting. The dual structure of a projective plane is also a projective plane. The dual plane of a pappian plane is pappian and can also be coordinatized by homogeneous coordinates. A nondegenerate dual conic section is analogously defined by a quadratic form.

A dual conic can be generated by Steiner's dual method:

Given the point sets of two lines  and a projective but not perspective mapping  of  onto . Then the lines connecting corresponding points form a dual non-degenerate projective conic section.

A perspective mapping  of the point set of a line  onto the point set of a line  is a bijection (1-1 correspondence) such that the connecting lines of corresponding points intersect at a fixed point , which is called the centre of the perspectivity  (see figure).

A projective  mapping is a finite sequence of perspective mappings.

It is usual, when dealing with dual and common conic sections, to call the common conic section a point conic and the dual conic a line conic.

In the case that the underlying field has  all the tangents of a point conic intersect in a point, called the knot (or nucleus) of the conic. Thus, the dual of a non-degenerate point conic is a subset of points of a dual line and not an oval curve (in the dual plane). So, only in the case that  is the dual of a non-degenerate point conic a non-degenerate line conic.

Examples 

(1) Projectivity given by two perspectivities:
Two lines  with intersection point  are given and a projectivity  from  onto  by two perspectivities   with centers .  maps line  onto a third line ,  maps line  onto line  (see diagram). Point  must not lie on the lines . Projectivity  is the composition of the two perspectivities:  .
(If  would be a fixpoint,  would be perspective.)

(2) Three points and their images are given:
The following example is the dual one given above for a Steiner conic. 
The images of the points  are given: . The projective mapping  can be represented by the product of the following perspectivities : 
  is the perspectivity of the point set of line  onto the point set of line  with centre . 
  is the perspectivity of the point set of line  onto the point set of line  with centre .
One easily checks that the projective mapping  fulfills . Hence for any arbitrary point  the image  can be constructed and line  is an element of a non degenerate dual conic section.

Intrinsic conics in a linear incidence geometry 
The Steiner construction defines the conics in a planar linear incidence geometry (two points determine at most one line and two lines intersect in at most one point) intrinsically, that is, using only the collineation group.

By contrast, the collineation group of the real hyperbolic plane consists of isometries. Consequently, the intrinsic conics comprise a small but varied subset of the general conics, curves obtained from the intersections of projective conics with a hyperbolic domain. Further, unlike the Euclidean plane, there is no overlap between the direct  -  preserves orientation - and the opposite  -  reverses orientation. The direct case includes central (two perpendicular lines of symmetry) and non-central conics, whereas every opposite conic is central. Even though direct and opposite central conics cannot be congruent, they are related by a quasi-symmetry defined in terms of complementary angles of parallelism. In fact, the central conics represent all genus 1 curves with real shape invariant . Using the elliptic curve addition law on each trajectory, every general central conic in decomposes uniquely as the sum of two intrinsic conics by adding pairs of points where the conics intersect each trajectory.

Notes

References

 
  (PDF; 891 kB).
 

Conic sections
Theorems in projective geometry